Adam Murrills (born 23 March 1990 in Manchester) is an English professional squash player. As of February 2018, he was ranked number 82 in the world.

References

1990 births
Living people
English male squash players